The 1998 World Rally Championship was the 26th season of the FIA World Rally Championship. The season consisted of 13 rallies. Tommi Mäkinen won his third consecutive drivers' world championship driving for Mitsubishi, ahead of Carlos Sainz and Colin McRae. The manufacturers' title was won by Mitsubishi (who still operated under Group A regulations), ahead of Toyota and Subaru. This year also marked the Ford Escort's last full-season works outing before being replaced by the Ford Focus WRC in 1999. The season ended in dramatic fashion when Carlos Sainz's Corolla WRC stopped approximately 300 metres from the finishing line in the final stage at Margam due to mechanical failure, thus surrendering his fourth place on the rally and handing the title to Mäkinen.

Calendar

The 1998 championship was contested over thirteen rounds in Europe, Africa, South America and Oceania.

Teams and drivers

Results and standings

Drivers' championship

Co-drivers' championship

Manufacturers' championship

FIA Teams' Cup

Events

External links 

 FIA World Rally Championship 1998 at ewrc-results.com

World Rally Championship
World Rally Championship seasons